Streptomonospora alba is a halophilic species of bacteria. YIM 90003(T) (=CCTCC AA001013(T)=DSM 44588(T)) is the type strain. It is closest to Streptomonospora salina. Its genome sequence was reported in 2015.

Description
Its aerial mycelium and substrate mycelium are well developed on most media. The aerial mycelium form short spore chains, bearing non-motile, straight to flexuous spores with wrinkled surfaces.

Metabolites
Streptomonospora alba was found to produce streptomonomicin, a lasso peptide antibiotic. Streptomonomicin displayed selective antibacterial activity against bacteria of the Bacillota phylum, especially Bacillus anthracis, while being inactive against Pseudomonadota or Ascomycota.

References

Further reading
Whitman, William B., et al., eds. Bergey's manual® of systematic bacteriology. Vol. 5. Springer, 2012.

External links

LPSN
Type strain of Streptomonospora alba at BacDive -  the Bacterial Diversity Metadatabase

Actinomycetota
Bacteria described in 2003